María Magdalena Aicega Amicarelli (born November 1, 1973 in Buenos Aires) is a retired field hockey player from Argentina, who won the silver medal at the 2000 Summer Olympics in Sydney, Australia and the bronze medal at the 2004 Summer Olympics in Athens, Greece and at the 2008 Summer Olympics in Beijing, China with the National Team. Magdalena also won the 2002 World Cup, two Champions Trophy, four gold medals at the Pan American Games and the Pan American Cup in 2001. Nicknamed Magui, she first represented her native country at the Junior World Cup in 1993 in Barcelona, Spain, where Argentina won the gold. The following year the penalty corner hitter played for the senior team, finishing second at the World Cup in Dublin, Ireland.

She was awarded with the Silver Olimpia Award, the most prestigious local prize awarded by Argentina's Sports Journalists Association, in 1998 and 2003. She was also nominated for the FIH's Best Player of the Year in 1999, won by Australia's Alyson Annan.

References

 CA Hockey
 María Magdalena Aicega at Olympics at Sports-Reference.com

External links
 
 Website with more information
 
 

1973 births
Living people
Argentine female field hockey players
Field hockey players from Buenos Aires
Field hockey players at the 1996 Summer Olympics
Field hockey players at the 2000 Summer Olympics
Field hockey players at the 2004 Summer Olympics
Field hockey players at the 2007 Pan American Games
Field hockey players at the 2008 Summer Olympics
Olympic field hockey players of Argentina
Olympic silver medalists for Argentina
Olympic bronze medalists for Argentina
Pan American Games gold medalists for Argentina
Las Leonas players
Olympic medalists in field hockey
Medalists at the 2000 Summer Olympics
Medalists at the 2004 Summer Olympics
Medalists at the 2008 Summer Olympics
Pan American Games medalists in field hockey
Medalists at the 2007 Pan American Games
Medalists at the 1995 Pan American Games
Medalists at the 1999 Pan American Games
Medalists at the 2003 Pan American Games
20th-century Argentine women
21st-century Argentine women